is a railway station in the town of  Yahaba, Iwate Prefecture, Japan, operated by East Japan Railway Company (JR East).

Lines
Yahaba Station is served by the Tōhoku Main Line, and is located 525.1 rail kilometers from the terminus of the line at Tokyo Station.

Station layout
The station has one side platform and one island platform. The platforms are elevated, with the station building located underneath. The station is adjacent to the elevated rails of the Tōhoku Shinkansen, although the Tōhoku Shinkansen does not stop here. The station is staffed and has a Midori no Madoguchi ticket office.

Platforms

History
Yahaba Station was opened on 1 September 1898. The station building was rebuilt in March 1977. The station was absorbed into the JR East network upon the privatization of the Japanese National Railways (JNR) on 1 April 1987. A new elevated station building was completed in March 2009.

Passenger statistics
In fiscal 2018, the station was used by an average of 3,024 passengers daily (boarding passengers only).

Surrounding area
Site of Tokutan Castle
Yahaba Post Office

See also
 List of Railway Stations in Japan

References

External links

 JR East Station information 

Railway stations in Iwate Prefecture
Tōhoku Main Line
Railway stations in Japan opened in 1898
Yahaba, Iwate
Stations of East Japan Railway Company